The Central National Bank building is a 23-story              (282 ft) Art Deco skyscraper located in Richmond, Virginia. Completed in 1929, it was one of the first skyscrapers in the city of Richmond not in the heart of the financial district. According to architectural historian Richard Guy Wilson, it and the West Hospital building, are the only two skyscrapers in Richmond to have used the fashionable Art Deco ziggurat-inspired setback, and only a few others exist elsewhere in Virginia.  When the bank later changed hands, it was known as the Central Fidelity Bank. It was used as a branch bank for Wachovia Corp. until that closed in 2000. After nearly fifteen years of vacancy, it was converted into apartments, and the first resident moved into the building in mid-2016. The redevelopment is called to "Deco at CNB," a 200-apartment development by Douglas Development Corp.

It was added to the National Register of Historic Places in 1979. It is located in the Grace Street Commercial Historic District.

See also
Allied Arts Building

References

External links
SAH Archipedia Building Entry

National Register of Historic Places in Richmond, Virginia
Art Deco architecture in Virginia
Commercial buildings completed in 1929
Bank buildings on the National Register of Historic Places in Virginia
Individually listed contributing properties to historic districts on the National Register in Virginia
Residential skyscrapers in Virginia
Skyscrapers in Richmond, Virginia